The 2005-06 FFHG Division 1 season was contested by 16 teams, and saw Étoile Noire de Strasbourg win the championship. They were promoted to the Ligue Magnus as result. The Lions de Lyon and the Castors d'Asnières were relegated to FFHG Division 2.

Regular season

Northern Group

Southern Group

Second round

Final round

Relegation

Relegation round

Relegation
 Boxers de Bordeaux - Lions de Lyon 7:5/5:3

External links
Season on hockeyarchives.info

FFHG Division 1 seasons
2005–06 in French ice hockey
Fra